Clinostigma samoense is a species of flowering plant in the family Arecaceae. It is found only in Samoa. It is threatened by habitat loss.

References

samoense
Endangered plants
Endemic flora of Samoa
Taxonomy articles created by Polbot